Girls' Invasion is the debut studio album by South Korean girl group Lovelyz. The album was released digitally and physically on November 17, 2014, by Woollim Label and distributed by LOEN Entertainment. The album contains nine tracks including the lead single "Candy Jelly Love". On March 3, 2015, the album was re-released as Hi~ with two new songs, including the lead single of the same name.

The album starts Lovelyz's school-themed Girls trilogy. The theme continued with the release of the album repackage Hi~ and finally concluded with the release of their EP Lovelyz8 (2015).

Background and release

Girls' Invasion

On November 3, 2014, Woollim Entertainment announced their first girl group Lovelyz. Woollim Entertainment also released the first teaser image, revealing the group's 8-member lineup as well as details for their debut. The group would have a pre-release on November 10 and a showcase on November 12 while their debut album would drop on November 17.

On November 4, Lovelyz released individual and group teaser images and a pre-debut video, showing behind the scenes footage of the girls preparing for their debut. It was also announced that the name of their debut album would be "Girls' Invasion". On November 10, a pre-release track "Good Night Like Yesterday" was released with the accompanying  music video, starring Infinite's Sungkyu alongside the Lovelyz members. The album preview video was released on the same day. On November 17, Lovelyz officially released their debut album with title track "Candy Jelly Love". On December 3, the group released a choreography version for "Candy Jelly Love".

Hi~

On February 22, 2015, Woollim Entertainment announced that Lovelyz would be releasing a repackaged version of the album on March 3, including two new songs. It was also confirmed that Jisoo would remain absent for the upcoming promotions. On February 23, Lovelyz released a teaser video for their new track "Hi~". On March 3, Lovelyz released the repackaged album "Hi~"and its music video.

Promotion
Prior to debut, Woollim Entertainment confirmed that Seo Jisoo wouldn't participate in debut promotions due to personal issues. 
Lovelyz held their debut showcase on November 12 at the K-ART Hall in Olympic Park. The group had their official debuted stage, performing "Good Night Like Yesterday" & "Candy Jelly Love"on November 13. After the album release, the group would perform "Candy Jelly Love" on weekly music show with another track from the album, "Getaway".

Track listing

Girls' Invasion

Hi~ (Repackaged album)

Charts

Albums
Girls' Invasion

Hi~

Singles
Candy Jelly Love

Hi~

Sales and certifications

Release history

References

External links
 
 
 

Lovelyz albums
2014 debut albums
Korean-language albums
Kakao M albums